Michele Anderson is a Human Trafficking Advocate at Covenant House Toronto who specializes in working to support victims of sex trafficking and advocating on their behalf.  In 2014 Covenant House described Anderson as having over twenty years experience working with youth victimized by sex traffickers.

Anderson plays a key role as part of Covenant House's Human Trafficking Team in supporting victims and educating service providers and law enforcement to recognize the signs of a victim and how to help them. Police routinely call upon Anderson when they make raids, or otherwise discover victims of sex trafficking.

Covenant House launched its comprehensive plan to combat sex trafficking in 2016. The plan proposes measures ranging from prevention to enhanced victim services, a research and evaluation component and an online resource hub

Awards 
Anderson was presented with a 2015 Ontario Victim Services Awards of Distinction for her work.

References

Canadian criminologists
Canadian women criminologists
Canadian women activists
Anti–human trafficking activists
Activists from Toronto
Youth work
Human trafficking in Canada
Covenant House